The Bursa tram network (sometimes stylized as Burtram) forms part of the public transport system in the city Bursa, Marmara Region, Turkey.  The tram network is operated by Burulaş, which also operates Bursa's metro system called Bursaray.  Bursa's tramway is made up of three lines: a metre gauge heritage tramline called T3 that opened first in 2011, a standard gauge modern tramline called T1 that opened in 2013 and a LRT line called T2 that opened in 2022.

Tram routes

The modern tramline, T1, operates in a loop from Stadium to Gazcilar and back. The heritage tramline, T3, runs from Çinarönü to Zafer Plaza.

T1 Line characteristics

Opened: 13 October 2013
Total length: 
Number of stops: 16
Rail gauge:  (standard gauge)
Operating hours: 7:00 am to 11:00 pm
Frequency: 8–15 minutes
Fare: 2 ₺
Rolling stock: Durmaray Silkworm tram

T3 Line characteristics

Opened: 28 May 2011
Total length: 
Number of stops: 9
Rail gauge:  (metre gauge)
Operating hours: 7:00 am to 11:00 pm
Fare: 2 ₺

Gallery

See also

 Bursaray
 List of town tramway systems in Turkey
 List of tram and light rail transit systems

References

External links
 Burtram – official website

Tram transport in Turkey
Standard gauge railways in Turkey
Metre gauge railways in Turkey
Transport in Bursa
Bursa